H road may refer to :
 Horizontal Grid Roads in the Milton Keynes grid road system
 H roads in Slovenia are Hitra cesta, a type of highway
 H roads in Ukraine are national roads
 In the United States:
 Interstate Highways in Hawaii: See :Category:Interstate Highways in Hawaii
 County-designated highways in zone H in Michigan
 Corridor H, part of the Appalachian Development Highway System